Qezelabad (also Romanized as Qezelābād) is a village in Jafarabad Rural District, Jafarabad District, Qom County, Qom Province, Iran. At the 2006 census, its population was 111, in 22 families.

References 

Populated places in Qom Province